San Martín is a department of Santiago del Estero Province (Argentina), and one of the twenty-seven administrative units of the province.

References

External links
 Departamento San Martín (Spanish)

Departments of Santiago del Estero Province